KCFS may refer to:

 KCFS-LP, a low-power radio station (98.1 FM) licensed to serve El Dorado Hills, California, United States
 KGWD, a radio station (94.5 FM) licensed to serve Sioux Falls, South Dakota, United States, which held the call sign KCFS from 1985 to 2015